

References

Arcade video games